Cox College  was a private women's college located in College Park, Georgia that operated from 1842 to 1934.

Cox College was originally called LaGrange Female Seminary in 1842 when it opened in LaGrange, Georgia. It changed names several times: to LaGrange Collegiate Seminary for Young Ladies in 1850, Southern and Western Female College in 1852, Southern Female College in 1854; and finally to Cox College by the 1890s. Part of the school moved to East Point, Georgia in the 1890s, however the main institution moved to Manchester, Georgia in 1895, which renamed itself College Park in 1896. By 1913 it was sometimes referred to as Cox College and Conservatory. It closed several times, including ten years between 1923 and 1933. It reopened one more time in 1933, but closed for a final time in 1934. Cox College’s closure effectively rendered the name of College Park a misnomer.

Notable alumni
 Ruth Blair, first woman state historian of Georgia
 Lella A. Dillard (A. B. 1881), president of the Georgia Woman's Christian Temperance Union
 Ida Pruitt, social worker and writer on Sino-American relations
 Lucy May Stanton, artist known for her portrait miniatures, graduated in 1893

See also
 List of current and historical women's universities and colleges

References

Sources
 Early 1900s College Viewbook for Cox College, Westminster College
 Cox College and Conservatory, The Digital Library of Georgia

Educational institutions established in 1842
Educational institutions disestablished in 1934
Defunct private universities and colleges in Georgia (U.S. state)
Former women's universities and colleges in the United States
1842 establishments in Georgia (U.S. state)
1934 disestablishments in Georgia (U.S. state)
History of women in Georgia (U.S. state)